In and Out of Fashion is the debut recording and the first EP and 12" single of new wave band the Teardrops, released by Bent Records, in 1978. The band was formed by then Buzzcocks bass guitarist Steve Garvey, among others. Shortly after the release of the EP, Karl Burns and Tony Friel, both from the Fall joined the band, until their disbanding in 1981.

The next EP, Leave Me No Choice, had the same tracks, but probably re-recorded, because the line-up was composed by Garvey and newcomers Tony Friel and Karl Burns.

Track listing
"Leave Me No Choice"
"Pompous"
"Teenage Vice"
"Blueser Blue"

Personnel
 Trevor Wain: vocals, guitar
 John Key: vocals, guitar
 Dave Brisbane: guitar
 Steve Garvey: vocals, bass
 Jimmy Donelly: vocals, drums

References

External links
 Information in 70's UK Punk

1978 debut EPs
New wave EPs